Frederick Gibbs may refer to:

 Frederick J. Gibbs (1899–1963), World War I flying ace
 Frederick Gibbs (educationalist) (1866–1953), New Zealand school principal, educationalist and community leader
 Frederick S. Gibbs (1845–1903), American politician from New York